Li Hua (born April 29, 1977, in Shanghai) is a male  beach volleyball player from PR China, who twice won a medal in the men's team competition at the Asian Games, partnering compatriots Gu Hongyu (Bangkok, gold) and Zhao Chicheng (Busan, bronze).

Playing partners
 Li Ting
 Zhao Chicheng
 Gu Hongyu
 Yi Xu
 Li Jialu

References
 Profile

1977 births
Living people
Chinese beach volleyball players
Men's beach volleyball players
Asian Games medalists in beach volleyball
Beach volleyball players at the 1998 Asian Games
Beach volleyball players at the 2002 Asian Games
Volleyball players from Shanghai
Asian Games gold medalists for China
Asian Games bronze medalists for China
Medalists at the 1998 Asian Games
Medalists at the 2002 Asian Games